Rambleridge Park was developed in the late 1970s at 11424 Fort Street in Omaha, Nebraska. The park includes a lagoon, walking trails, soccer fields and a large green space for miscellaneous activities.  A small playground is located farther in the neighborhood and can be reached after a short walk.  The park and green spaces throughout the neighborhood are maintained by the City of Omaha and the residents of the neighborhood.

A large open area is often used by soccer teams that are practicing for upcoming games, frisbee throwers, golfers and baseball fans practicing their pitch. Parking for the park is limited to street parking or using the church parking lot, (when available). The large open area is often used by soccer teams that are practicing for upcoming games, frisbee throwers, golfers and baseball fans practicing their pitch. Surrounding businesses include Hy-Vee Foods (grocery)and Walgreens, as well as an arrangement of restaurants, gas stations and other small businesses making this park an ideal location for a family gathering. The park gazebo can be reserved by contacting the city of Omaha Parks and Recreation department.

See also

Parks in Omaha, Nebraska

External links
Rambleridge Home Owners Association website

Parks in Omaha, Nebraska
1970s establishments in Nebraska